The Kuta is a Siberian river north of Lake Baikal in Irkutsk Oblast, Russia, that flows into the Lena at Ust-Kut.  With its right tributary, the Kupa, it forms a ‘T’ shape with the flat head pointing west and the point at Ust-Kut.

Course  
It flows first west and then south through the taiga and swampland of the Lena-Angara Plateau. At its juncture with the Kupa, it turns east and flows through a relatively narrow and deep valley to Ust-Kut. It is not navigable and is frozen from November to the middle of May. The upper course is practically uninhabited, but is used for forestry. The lower course has a few villages. The next river to the west is the Ilim. In Cossack times a portage from the Ilim to the Kuta connected the Yenisei and Lena basins.

Tributaries 
The Kupa is a right tributary that flows directly north and joins the Kuta where it turns east.

See also 
 Siberian River Routes

References 

Rivers of Irkutsk Oblast